Memoryhouse is a Canadian indie dream pop music group formed in 2009 in Guelph, Ontario.  The band was signed to Sub Pop. Memoryhouse consists of Evan Abeele (composer) and Denise Nouvion (vocalist). Their sound has been described as similar to that of Beach House.

Reception
In reviewing the 2010 release of The Years, Pitchfork wrote that "the EP clearly sets Abeele and Nouvion apart from their more amateur peers. The Years may be awash in nostalgia, but far from inviting unfavorable comparisons, it mostly confirms that the past was indeed as good as you remember."

Discography

Albums

The Slideshow Effect (February 28, 2012), Sub Pop
Soft Hate (February 9, 2016), Self Released

EPs
The Years (2010), Self-Released
The Years EP (2011), Sub Pop
Digital Fire, Digital Burn - Holiday Songs 2010-2015 (December 15, 2015), Self-Released
Mania (April 6, 2021), Self-Released

Singles
Lately 7" (June 2, 2010), Inflated
Caregiver 7" (November 9, 2010), Suicide Squeeze

References

External links
 Official website

Suicide Squeeze Records artists
Musical groups established in 2010
Musical groups from Toronto
Canadian indie pop groups
Canadian musical duos
Pop music duos
Sub Pop artists
2010 establishments in Ontario